Robert Bauer (born 9 April 1995) is a German professional footballer who plays as a full-back or as a wing-back for Belgian club Sint-Truiden.

Club career
Bauer joined FC Ingolstadt in 2014 from Karlsruher SC. He made his 2. Bundesliga debut on 31 October 2014 against Fortuna Düsseldorf replacing Alfredo Morales at half-time in a 0–0 away draw. He scored his first Bundesliga goal from his first shot of the campaign against Darmstadt 98 on 22 November 2015.

On 23 August 2016, Bauer signed for Werder Bremen.

On 5 July 2018, it was announced that Bauer was loaned to 1. FC Nürnberg for the 2018–19 season. Nürnberg secured an option to sign him permanently at the end of the season.

In June 2019, upon his return from loan at Nürnberg, Bauer was released from training at Werder Bremen.

On 20 August 2019, he signed a long-term contract with Russian club FC Arsenal Tula.

On 6 September 2021, he joined Sint-Truiden in Belgium.

International career
Eligible to represent Germany or Kazakhstan, Bauer revealed that he had rejected an offer from the latter in February 2015 in hopes of representing Germany. The next month, he received his first call-up to the Germany U20 side and represented them at the FIFA U-20 World Cup in New Zealand that summer.

He was part of the squad for the 2016 Summer Olympics, where Germany won the silver medal.

Career statistics

Honours
Germany
Summer Olympic Games: Silver Medal, 2016

References

1995 births
Living people
Sportspeople from Pforzheim
German footballers
German people of Kazakhstani descent
Kazakhstani people of German descent
Association football midfielders
Bundesliga players
2. Bundesliga players
Regionalliga players
Russian Premier League players
FC Ingolstadt 04 players
FC Ingolstadt 04 II players
SV Werder Bremen players
1. FC Nürnberg players
FC Arsenal Tula players
Sint-Truidense V.V. players
Expatriate footballers in Russia
German expatriate footballers
German expatriate sportspeople in Russia
Expatriate footballers in Belgium
German expatriate sportspeople in Belgium
Germany youth international footballers
Footballers at the 2016 Summer Olympics
Olympic footballers of Germany
Medalists at the 2016 Summer Olympics
Olympic silver medalists for Germany
Olympic medalists in football
Footballers from Baden-Württemberg